Kera is an East Chadic language spoken by 45,000 people in Southwest Chad and 6,000 people in North Cameroon.

It was called "Tuburi" by Joseph Greenberg, a name shared with Tupuri.

In Cameroon, Kera is spoken by small, isolated and scattered groups in the southern departments of Mayo-Danay (Wina commune) and Diamaré (Ndoukoula district) in the Far North Region. It is mainly spoken in Chad. In Cameroon, the main group is near the border, south of Viri. There are about 6,000 speakers in Cameroon.

Grammar
Kera is a subject–verb–object language, using prepositions. It uses exclusively borderline case-marking.

Phonology 
The phonetic symbols and charts used are from the International Phonetic Alphabet (IPA)

Consonants

Vowels ATR allophones or undershoot in Kera? Retrieved 2019-06-02. 
Kera's vowels are, including allophones:

But can also be expressed as:

 High The tongue is positioned near the top of the mouth.
 Round The lips are rounded while the vowel is pronounced.
 Front The tongue is positioned at the front of the mouth.

Kera has vowel harmony.

In Kera, many words are required to only have vowels in the high or not high vowel class. For example, a word may have any of the vowels i ə u or any of the vowels e a o, but words containing both, e.g. words with i and o, are prohibited.

References

External links
Research on stress in Kera

Languages of Cameroon
Languages of Chad
East Chadic languages